Jiangbei Town is a town in Changsha County, Changsha, Hunan province, China. It administers three communities and thirteen villages.

Tourist attractions
The Former Residence of Xu Teli is a popular attraction.

References

Bibliography
 

Divisions of Changsha County
Changsha County